Nkosana Makate (born 1977), is a South African who proposed the "Please Call Me" concept to Vodacom. His idea consisted of sending a free message to other Vodacom users in order to request that they call you, even if you do not have enough credit available to do so. Nkosana Makate shared the concept with his employer, but never received payment for it. He laid a charge against Vodacom and won the case against them after an 8-year battle.

Legal case
Vodacom started the Please Call Me service in 2001. A 2014 judgement in the South Gauteng High Court supported Makate's claim to having originated Please Call Me. It also rejected former CEO Alan Knott-Craig's claim that he had come up with the idea of the messaging service. Yet the High Court found against Makate, holding that Geissler had not had the authority to promise Makate such compensation and that the debt would have expired (in legal terms, been prescribed) within three years.

Makate appealed the case, and later took it to the Constitutional Court. In April 2016, Justice Chris Jafta found in Makate's favour and against Vodacom.

References

Discovery and invention controversies
South African businesspeople
1977 births
Living people